Virginia Luella Brewer (November 23 or January 17, 1920s – December 2, 2006), known professionally as Betty Brewer, was an American actress.

Brewer was born in Joplin, Missouri, however her date of birth is a cause for some dispute with some sources stating November 23, 1923 or 1924, and others claiming January 17, 1927. She made her film debut in Rangers of Fortune (1940).

She died in Oakland, California in December 2006.

Selected filmography
The Round Up (1941)
Las Vegas Nights (1941)
Mrs. Wiggs of the Cabbage Patch (1942)
Wild Bill Hickok Rides (1942)
 Juke Girl (1942)
 My Kingdom for a Cook (1943)

References

External links
 

1920s births
2006 deaths
Year of birth uncertain
Date of birth uncertain
American child actresses
American film actresses
People from Joplin, Missouri
20th-century American actresses
20th-century American people
21st-century American women